Cefsulodin is a third-generation cephalosporin antibiotic that is active against Pseudomonas aeruginosa and was discovered by Takeda Pharmaceutical Company in 1977.

TAP Pharmaceuticals had a new drug application on file with FDA for cefsulodin under the brand name Cefonomil as of 1985.

Cefsulodin is most commonly used in cefsulodin-irgasan-novobiocin agar to select for Yersinia microorganisms. This agar is most often used in water and beverage testing.

Susceptibility data 
The following represents MIC susceptibility data for various P. aeruginosa strains:
 Pseudomonas aeruginosa PA13 (resistant strain): 32 μg/ml
 Pseudomonas aeruginosa (wild-type, susceptible): 4 - 8 μg/ml

References

Cephalosporin antibiotics
Isonicotinamides
Takeda Pharmaceutical Company brands
Sulfonates